Bong-7 is an electoral district for the elections to the House of Representatives of Liberia. The constituency covers the Fuamah District and the Sanayea District (except the Gou, Laryea and Gbonota communities).

Elected representatives

References

Electoral districts in Liberia